Mehmedabad is one of the 182 Legislative Assembly constituencies of Gujarat state in India. It is part of Kheda district.

List of segments
This assembly seat represents the following segments,

 Mehmedabad Taluka
 Kheda Taluka (Part) Villages – Lali, Mahij, Bidaj, Kanera, Sarsa, Vasna Margiya, Sankhej, Vaikunthpura, Pinglaj, Kathwada, Navagam, Malarpura, Samadra, Dedarda, Parsantaj, Vasna-Khurd, Kajipura, Gobhalaj, Pansoli, Chalindra, Dharoda, Chitrasar, Kaloli

Members of Legislative Assembly
2007 - Sundarsinh Chauhan, Bharatiya Janata Party
2012 - Gautambhai Chauhan, Indian National Congress

Election results

2022

2017

2012

See also
 List of constituencies of Gujarat Legislative Assembly
 Gujarat Legislative Assembly

References

External links
 

Assembly constituencies of Gujarat
Kheda district